Oded Machnes (born 8 June 1956) is an Israeli retired footballer who was a striker. He is the second-greatest goal-scorer in Israeli history with 196 goals in the Israeli Premier League.

Honours

National
Israeli Premier League (4):
1973–74, 1977–78, 1979–80, 1982–83
State Cup (1):
1977-78
Israeli Supercup (4):
1973-74, 1977–78, 1979–80, 1982-83

International
UEFA Intertoto Cup (3):
1978, 1980, 1983

Individual
Israeli Premier League – Top Goalscorer (4):
1975–76, 1978–79, 1981–82, 1982–83
Israeli Footballer of the Year (3):
1977-78, 1981–82, 1982–83

Personal life
Oded's twin brother Gad was a defender and both played together in Maccabi Netanya and in Maccabi Petah Tikva.

References

External links
 
 Oded Machnes at Kufsa.co.il

1956 births
Living people
Israeli Jews
Israeli footballers
Israel international footballers
Israeli twins
Twin sportspeople
Maccabi Netanya F.C. players
Maccabi Petah Tikva F.C. players
Maccabi Tel Aviv F.C. players
Hapoel Hadera F.C. players
Hapoel Tiberias F.C. players
Hapoel Tzafririm Holon F.C. players
Footballers from Netanya
Maccabi Netanya F.C. managers
Olympic footballers of Israel
Footballers at the 1976 Summer Olympics
Association football forwards
Israeli football managers
Israeli Footballer of the Year recipients